Quiara Alegría Hudes (born 1977) is an American playwright, producer, lyricist and essayist. She is best known for writing the book for the musical In the Heights, and screenplay for its film adaptation. Hudes' first play in her Elliot Trilogy, Elliot, A Soldier's Fugue was a finalist for the 2007 Pulitzer Prize for Drama; she received the 2012 Pulitzer Prize for Drama for her second play in that trilogy, Water by the Spoonful.

Early life
Hudes was born in 1977 in Philadelphia, Pennsylvania, to a Jewish father and a Puerto Rican mother. They raised her in West Philadelphia, where she began composing music and writing. She studied at the Mary Louise Curtis Branch of Settlement Music School, taking piano lessons with Dolly Krasnopolsky. She has stated that although she is of "Puerto Rican and Jewish blood", she was "raised by two Puerto Rican parents." Her step-father was a Puerto Rican entrepreneur.

Hudes graduated from Philadelphias Central High School. She studied music composition at Yale University, where she earned her BA in 1999. She subsequently attended Brown University, where she received an MFA in playwriting in 2004. She is a resident writer at New Dramatists and a previous Page 73 Playwriting Fellow. 

In 2012, Hudes was a visiting playwright at Wesleyan University in Middletown, Connecticut. She returned in 2014, serving as the Shapiro Distinguished Professor of Writing and Theater until 2017.

Career
The original Off-Broadway production of In the Heights received the Lucille Lortel Award and Outer Critics Circle Award for Best Musical. It was named Best Musical by New York magazine, Best of 2007 by The New York Times, and the Hispanic Organization of Latin Actors HOLA Award for Outstanding Achievement in Playwriting.

In 2010, she was named a Fellow by United States Artists. Hudes's first children's book, In My Neighborhood, was published by Arthur Levine Books, an imprint of Scholastic Inc, in 2010.

On October 27, 2011, Quiara Alegría Hudes was the first Latin woman to be inducted into Central High School's Alumni Hall of Fame. In October 2016, a new musical Hudes wrote along with singer/songwriter Erin McKeown titled Miss You Like Hell opened at the La Jolla Playhouse directed by Lear deBessonet and starring Daphne Rubin-Vega.

Plays and musicals

Yemaya's Belly 
Hudes' first play, Yemaya's Belly, received the 2003 Clauder Competition for New England Playwriting, the Paula Vogel Award in Playwriting, and the Kennedy Center/ACTF Latina Playwriting Award and had productions at the Portland Stage Company (2005), the Signature Theatre (2005), and Miracle Theatre (2004).

Elliot, A Soldier's Fugue 
Elliot, a Soldier's Fugue was a Pulitzer Prize finalist in 2007. The play premiered at Page 73 Productions at the Off-Broadway Culture Project in 2006, and ran at the Alliance Theatre, Atlanta, Georgia in 2006. The New York Times reviewer wrote that the play was a "rare and rewarding thing: a theater work that succeeds on every level, while creating something new."

26 Miles 
Her play 26 Miles received its world premiere at The Alliance Theatre in Atlanta in March 2009, directed by Kent Gash.

Barrio Grrrrl! 
Her children's musical Barrio Grrrrl! appeared at The Kennedy Center in 2009.

In the Heights 

The hit Broadway musical with lyrics by Lin-Manuel Miranda and a book by Quiara Alegría Hudes won the 2008 Tony Award for Best Musical and was a finalist for the 2009 Pulitzer Prize for Drama. Hudes also wrote the screenplay for the film adaptation, which premiered in 2021.

Water by the Spoonful 

In 2012, Water by the Spoonful, which returns to the characters in Elliot, won the Pulitzer Prize after its premiere at the Hartford Stage Company. In this play Hudes attempts to bring two worlds together through technology and reality. Water by the Spoonful consists of multiple scenes that take place in an online chat room and in the real world with face to face interaction. As the play develops, Hudes brings the two worlds together by creating turning points in the play along with connecting characters from different worlds to each other in different ways.

The Happiest Song Plays Last 
The Happiest Song Plays Last, the third in the Elliot trilogy, received its world premiere at the Goodman Theater in Chicago on April 13, 2013, and Off-Broadway at Second Stage in March 2014. The production then moved to Second Stage Theatre, and the production team included Ruben Santiago-Hudson as director, Michael Carnahan as set designer, Karen Perry as costume designer, Rui Rita as lighting designer, and Leon Rothenberg as sound designer.

Lulu's Golden Shoes 
Lulu's Golden Shoes was produced by Flashpoint Theater Company in Philadelphia in 2015.

The Good Peaches 
Originally performed by 56 orchestral musicians, three actors, and eight dancers, The Good Peaches is a "girl versus nature musical play." It was performed in April 2016 at the Cleveland Play House.

Daphne's Dive 
Daphne’s Dive premiered Off-Broadway at the Signature Theater on May 16, 2016, directed by Thomas Kail and featuring Samira Wiley, Daphne Rubin-Vega, Vanessa Aspillaga and Carlos Gomez.

Miss You Like Hell 

A musical by Quiara Alegría Hudes and Erin McKeown, Miss You Like Hell premiered at La Jolla Playhouse in fall of 2016. Called "An immigration musical for the new Trump era..." by the LA Times, the play is about a mother and daughter traveling across the country for seven days and addressing their fractured relationship.

Vivo 

Hudes was the screenwriter for Lin-Manuel Miranda's animated musical movie Vivo, released on Netflix on August 6, 2021.

Filmography

See also

 List of Puerto Rican writers
 List of Puerto Ricans
 Puerto Rican literature
 Jewish immigration to Puerto Rico
 Latino Theater in the United States

References

External links

 
 "Water by the Spoonful" Interview in Guernica, July 2012

Living people
American women dramatists and playwrights
American people of Jewish descent
American people of Puerto Rican descent
Central High School (Philadelphia) alumni
1977 births
Pulitzer Prize for Drama winners
Wesleyan University faculty
Writers from Philadelphia
Date of birth missing (living people)
Yale University alumni
21st-century American dramatists and playwrights
21st-century American women writers
Pulitzer Prize winners
Hispanic and Latino American dramatists and playwrights
Brown University alumni
American women academics